During the First World War, the Canadian Army authorized the formation of 260 infantry battalions to serve in the Canadian Expeditionary Force.  Only fifty-three of these battalions ever reached the front lines.  The remaining battalions, most often upon arrival in England, were broken up and primarily absorbed into a reserve battalion. In addition to the numbered battalions, there were two named battalions. Several regiments of Canadian Mounted Rifles (mounted infantry) were converted to regular infantry battalions and served in the Canadian Corps.

Besides the infantry, there were other Canadian combat units in the CEF, including cavalry and mounted infantry regiments (in particular the Canadian Cavalry Brigade), artillery brigades and machine gun battalions.

The infantry battalions in bold type served in the field.

Sources

 Chartrand, René, The Canadian Corps in World War I. Oxford: Osprey Publishing, 2007
 Canadian Expeditionary Force, 1914–1919 by G. W. L. Nicholson. Ottawa, Dept. of National Defence, 1962.
 
 Meek, John F.  Over the Top! The Canadian Infantry in the First World War.  Orangeville, Ont: The Author, 1971.

Infantry units and formations of Canada
 
Canadian Militia